Haskell is a surname with several origins. The English surname derives from the Norman personal name Aschetil (Old Norse Ásketill or Áskell), áss meaning god and ketill meaning helmet. The Ashkenazic surname derives from the personal name Khaskl; the Yiddish form is Yechezkel. Related surnames include Askelson, Askin, Axtell, Hascall, Haskett, Haskin, Hasty, and MacAskill.

People with the name include:

 Alexander Cheves Haskell (1839–1910), Confederate Army colonel, and Democratic politician
 Anne Haskell (born 1943), American politician from Maine
 Arlo Haskell, American author and publisher
 Arnold Haskell (1903–1980), British dance critic
 Barbara Haskell (born 1946), American art historian, curator at the Whitney Museum of American Art
 Charles N. Haskell (1860–1933), American lawyer, oilman, and statesman
 Charles Ready Haskell, namesake of Haskell County, Texas
 Colleen Haskell (born 1976), American former reality show contestant and actress
 David Haskell (1948–2000), American actor and singer
 David G. Haskell, British-born American biologist and author
 Dennis Haskell (born 1948), Australian poet and critic
 Diana Haskell, American clarinetist
 Douglas Haskell (1899–1979), American writer, architecture critic and magazine editor
 Dudley C. Haskell (1842–1883), American politician and merchant
 Edward Haskell (1906–1986), American scientist
 Ella Knowles Haskell (1860–1911), American lawyer
 Ernest Haskell (1876–1925), American artist and illustrator
 Fitch Harrison Haskell (1883–1962), American architect
 Floyd Haskell (1916–1998), US Senator from Colorado
 Francis Haskell (1928–2000), English art historian
 Frank A. Haskell (1828–1864), Union Army officer during the American Civil War
 Frank W. Haskell (1843–1903), Union soldier in the American Civil War, and Medal of Honor recipient
 Gil Haskell (born 1943), National Football League coach
 Gordon Haskell (born 1946), English pop music vocalist and songwriter
 H. Harrison Haskell (born 1939), Republican member of the Pennsylvania House of Representatives (1971–1978)
 Harriet Newell Haskell (1835–1907), American educator, principal of Monticello Seminary (1868–1907)
 Harry G. Haskell Jr. (1921–2020), American businessman and Republican politician
 Henri J. Haskell (1843–1921), first Montana Attorney General (1889–1897)
 Henry L. Haskell (1863–1940), American businessman and inventor
 Ida C. Haskell (1861–1932), American painter and educator
 Jack Haskell (c. 1920–1998), American singer and announcer
 Jack Haskell (producer), American theatrical producer
 James Haskell (born 1985), English rugby union player
 James Richard Haskell (1843–1897), American firearm designer
 Jane Haskell (1923–2013), American light artist
 Jimmie Haskell (1936–2016), American composer and arranger
 Job Haskell (1794–1879), American politician
 John G. Haskell (1832–1907), American architect
 John Haskell (author) (born 1958), American author
 Jonathan Haskel, British economist
 Jonathan Haskell (1755–1814), United States Army officer
 Lawrence Haskell (died 1964), American university administrator and sports coach
 Lillian Gallup Haskell (1862–1940), First Lady of Oklahoma, Oklahoma Hall of Fame inductee
 Llewellyn F. Haskell (born Thomas Frost Haskell; 1842–1929), Union Army officer during the American Civil War
 Loney Haskell (born Lorne Levy; 1870–1933), American vaudeville entertainer and theatre manager
 Marcus M. Haskell (1843–1925), Union soldier in the American Civil War
 Martin Haskell (born 1946), American physician
 Mary Haskell (missionary) (1869–1953), American congregationalist missionary in Bulgaria
 Mary Haskell (educator) (1873–1964)
 Mellen Woodman Haskell (1863–1948), American mathematician
 Miriam Haskell (1899–1981), American jewelry designer
 Molly Haskell (born 1939), American feminist film critic
 Nathaniel M. Haskell (1912–1983), Maine Republican politician
 Neil Haskell (born 1987), American contemporary dancer
 Norman Haskell (1905–1970), American geophysicist
 Oscar Haskell (1857–1943), New Zealand cricketer
 Peter Haskell (1934–2010), American television actor 
 Preston Haskell (born 1938), American civil engineer
 Reuben L. Haskell (1878–1971), US congressman from New York
 Sacha Haskell (born 1969), New Zealand association football, tennis and cricket player
 Stephen N. Haskell (1833–1922), American evangelist, missionary and editor in the Seventh-day Adventist Church
 Susan Haskell (born 1968), Canadian actress
 Thomas Haskell (historian) (1939–2017), American historian
 Timothy Haskell, New Zealand scientist
 Todd Philip Haskell (born 1962), American diplomat
 Wilf Haskell (born 1936), New Zealand cricketer and sports historian
 Will Haskell, member of the Connecticut State Senate
 William E. Haskell, American organ-builder and inventor 
 William N. Haskell (1878–1952), American military officer 
 William T. Haskell (1818–1859), American Tennessee Whig politician

See also
 Haskell (disambiguation)

References